Poorna Wannithilake (born 3 March 1998) is a Sri Lankan cricketer. He made his List A debut on 15 December 2019, for Nugegoda Sports and Welfare Club in the 2019–20 Invitation Limited Over Tournament. He made his Twenty20 debut on 12 January 2020, for Nugegoda Sports and Welfare Club in the 2019–20 SLC Twenty20 Tournament.

References

External links
 

1998 births
Living people
Sri Lankan cricketers
Nugegoda Sports and Welfare Club cricketers 
Place of birth missing (living people)